Andreas Loth (born 26 February 1972) is a German ice hockey player. He competed in the men's tournament at the 2002 Winter Olympics.

Career statistics

Regular season and playoffs

International

References

External links
 

1972 births
Living people
Olympic ice hockey players of Germany
Ice hockey players at the 2002 Winter Olympics
People from Weilheim-Schongau
Sportspeople from Upper Bavaria
EC Graz players
ERC Ingolstadt players
EV Landshut players
Kassel Huskies players
Kölner Haie players
VEU Feldkirch players
Wiener EV players